Year 1238 (MCCXXXVIII) was a common year starting on Friday (link will display the full calendar) of the Julian calendar.

Events 
 By place 

 Mongol Empire 
 January 15–20 – Siege of Moscow: The Mongols under Batu Khan and Subutai campaign across the northern heartland of the Kievan Rus', committing numerous atrocities across multiple settlements, including the sacking of an irrelevant little town known as Moscow. According to the Chronicle of Novgorod, Moscow is a fortified village, a trading post "on a crossroads of four rivers". The village is taken by the Mongols after 5 days of siege.
 March 4 – Battle of the Sit River: The Mongols defeat a Kievan Rus' army (some 4,000 men) under Grand Prince Yuri II of Vladimir in an engagement at the Sit River (located in the Sonkovsky District). With Yuri's death, so too dies the hope of any united Rus' resistance against the Mongols. Batu Khan splits his forces up into several contingents – ordering each to wreak havoc across the Rus' territories (modern-day Russia and Ukraine).
 March – Siege of Kozelsk: The 12-year-old Prince Vasily of Chernigov (grandson of Mstislav II Svyatoslavich), manages against all the odds, to hold out in his capital of Kozelsk for nearly two months with only citizen militia. He leads a successful sortie outside of the walls – where the garrison slaughters thousands of Mongols and destroys siege equipment. Finally, Kozelsk is conquered and Vasily is slaughtered alongside the inhabitants.
 Evpaty Kolovrat, Kievan knight (bogatyr), returns to his hometown of Ryazan, which is burnt to the ground by the Mongols (see 1237). He gathers some 1,700 survivors and pursues Batu Khan, attacking his rearguard, and annihilating thousands of Mongols. Finally, Kolovrat is slain from afar by siege-weaponry. Batu Khan shows admiration for his bravery and as a sign of respect, returns his body and allows his soldiers to return home. 
 Autumn – The Mongols under Batu Khan retire, leaving behind the ruined northern Rus' territories. He spends the rest of the year suppressing the last resistance of the Kipchaks, while his cousin Möngke (son of Tolui Khan) conquer the Alans and the northern Caucasian tribes. Later, Möngke makes a raid of reconnaissance as far as Kiev.

 Europe 
 June 8 – Treaty of Stensby: The Teutonic Knights sign a agreement with King Valdemar II (the Conqueror). William of Modena, Italian papal diplomat, meets Grand Master Hermann Balk and Valdemar on a Danish island, settling outstanding disputes with Denmark. The Livonian Brothers of the Sword (or Sword Brethren) are merged into the Teutonic Order as an autonomous branch and become known as the Livonian Order.
 July 11 – Siege of Brescia: Emperor Frederick II begins the siege of Brescia. He rejects the negotiations of the Lombard League and insists on unconditional surrender to the imperial forces in northern Italy. This blocks all possibilities of a peaceful settlement. Milan and five other Lombard cities are attacked. In early October, after a successful sortie by the city's defenders, Frederick is forced to lift the siege.
 August 21 –  Battle of Örlygsstaðir: Chieftain Sighvatr Sturluson and his son, Sturla Sighvatsson, are defeated by Kolbeinn ungi Arnórsson and Gissur Þorvaldsson, for control of Iceland (known as the Age of the Sturlungs).
 September 28 – King James I of Aragon captures the city of Valencia from the Moors, who retreat to Granada. During the campaign, James' cousin, Bernat Guillem de Montpeller, dies from wounds received in action.
 Autumn – Muhammad I, Almohad ruler of the Emirate of Granada,  begins the construction of the Alhambra Complex on the site of a pre-Islamic fortress.

 England 
 January – Simon de Montfort marries the 23-year-old Eleanor, sister of King Henry III. While the marriage takes place with the king's approval, the act itself is performed secretly and without consulting the barons. Eleanor has previously been married to William Marshal and has sworn a vow of perpetual chastity upon his death, which she breaks by marrying Montfort. Archbishop Edmund of Abingdon condemns the marriage for this reason.

 Middle East 
 March 6 – Al-Kamil, Ayyubid ruler of Egypt, dies at Damascus and is succeeded by his 18-year-old son Al-Adil II. After Al-Kamil's death, a civil war breaks out, and his elder son As-Salih Ayyub, sets out from Damascus to invade Egypt. But a sudden coup d'état dethrones him in favour of his uncle, As-Salih Ismail. 
 The Nizari Imam Muhammad III and the Abbasid caliph Al-Mustansir send a joint diplomatic mission to the European kings Louis IX (the Saint) and Henry III, to forge a Muslim–Christian alliance against the Mongols, but this is unsuccessful.

Births 
 March 12 – Serafina, Italian noblewoman and saint (d. 1253)
 April 23 – Narathihapate (or Sithu IV), Burmese ruler (d. 1287)
 May 1 – Magnus VI (the Law-mender), king of Norway (d. 1280)
 May 3 – Emilia Bicchieri, Italian nun and prioress (d. 1314)
 July 11 – Dafydd ap Gruffydd, prince of Wales (d. 1283)
 Al-Bahrani, Arab Shia scholar and philosopher (d. 1280)
 Guglielmo Agnelli, Italian sculptor and architect (d. 1313)
 Henry de Montfort, English nobleman and knight (d. 1265)
 Hōjō Nobutoki, Japanese nobleman and regent (d. 1323)
 Madhva Acharya, Indian Hindu religious leader (d. 1317)
 Maurice FitzGerald, Irish nobleman and justiciar (d. 1277)
 Meinhard II, duke of Carinthia (House of Gorizia) (d. 1295)
 Nicholas Segrave, English nobleman and knight (d. 1295)
 Nizamuddin Auliya (or Awliya), Indian Sufi scholar (d. 1325)
 Otto de Grandson, Savoyard nobleman and knight (d. 1328)
 Pedro Armengol, Spanish nobleman and priest (d. 1304)
 Rinchen Gyaltsen, Tibetan imperial preceptor (d. 1279)
 Yang Hui, Chinese mathematician and writer (d. 1298)
 Yao Sui, Chinese politician, poet and writer (d. 1313)
 Yunus Emre, Seljuk poet, mystic and writer (d. 1328)
 Zhang Hongfan, Chinese general and admiral (d. 1280)

Deaths 
 March 4
 Joan of England, queen consort of Scotland (b. 1210)
 Vasilko Konstantinovich, Kievan prince (b. 1209)
 Yuri II of Vladimir, Kievan Grand Prince (b. 1188) 
 March 6 – Al-Kamil, Ayyubid ruler of Egypt (b. 1177)
 March 16 – Benchō, Japanese Buddhist monk (b. 1162)
 March 19 – Henry I (the Bearded), duke of Poland 
 March 21 – Awhad al-Din Kermani, Persian Sufi poet
 June 9 – Peter des Roches, bishop of Winchester
 July 9 – William de Malveisin, bishop of St. Andrews
 July 10 – Sophia of Wittelsbach, German noblewoman
 September 28 – Jeanne des Roches, French baroness
 December 26 – Alexander de Stavenby, English bishop 
 Abu abd Allah Muhammad (or Ibn Hud), Almohad ruler
 Azriel of Gerona, Catalan rabbi and scholar (b. 1160)
 Evpaty Kolovrat, Kievan warrior and knight (b. 1200)
 Heinrich I von Müllenark, German archbishop (b. 1190)
 Hugh le Despenser, English nobleman and high sheriff
 Hugh of Ibelin (the Strong), Cypriot knight (b. 1213)
 John I (Axouchos Komnenos), Byzantine emperor
 John of Béthune, French military leader and knight
 Matsudono Moroie, Japanese nobleman (b. 1172)

References